A throw pillow, or toss pillow, is a small, decorative soft furnishing item made from a wide range of textiles including cotton, linen, silk, leather, microfibre, suede, chenille, and velvet. Throw pillows are a commonly used piece in interior design and come in a wide variety of shapes, sizes and decorative elements such as tassels and piped edges. The most common throw pillow designs are square and range from 16 inches to 24 inches. In the UK, a throw pillow is more commonly referred to as a scatter cushion.

Throw pillows are usually (loosely) placed on sofas or armchairs but are also frequently used on beds, day beds and floors. Throw pillows serve both an aesthetic and a functional purpose. Decorative pillows are commonly used to tie in color accents within a room, often drawing on the colors in drapes, walls or area rugs. They can also be used to give a more casual feeling by looking as though they were thrown onto a piece of furniture. From a functional perspective, throw pillows may provide back, neck and head support.

The simplest throw pillows do not have an opening and are often loose filled, meaning there is no insert. These cushions do not feature any additional decoration such as tassels or piping. These designs are mostly aimed at beginners to sewing. Typically, however, throw pillows combine a removable cover and an insert to make up the finished product. The cover can easily be removed and washed, or the insert changed if it becomes too flat or triggers allergies. The covers, commonly referred to as throw pillow covers or cushion covers, are often sold separately from the insert. These covers have a zipper opening, which comes in two variations: an envelope, which is used to conceal the zipper behind, and a hidden opening, which is found at the bottom, reverse of the cushion.

Concealed envelope opening

An envelope opening features an extra piece of fabric on the reverse of the cover and envelopes approximately 50% of the rear of the cushion. The envelope is used to hide the zip and makes removal of the cover much easier. This style uses more fabric for the envelope and even more so if the reverse of the pillow features a pattern that needs to be matched. Envelope openings are more common on covers that do not feature piped edges.

Hidden zip opening

The second variation is the hidden zip opening which is found on the very bottom and reverse side of the cushion. This is style is commonly used with covers with piping, which also helps to conceal the zip. This design uses less fabric than the envelope opening.

Throw pillow inserts

The second part of the throw pillow is the insert, which is designed to fit inside the pillow and provide the body and comfort of the pillow.

Inserts are usually filled with  down feathers, or a down alternative such as hollowfibre. Down alternatives are ideal for individuals with feather related allergies.

References

Pillows
Upholstery